HD 165259, also known as HR 6751 is a triple star system located in the southern circumpolar constellation of Apus.

HD 165259 consists of two main sequence stars, with stellar classifications of F5 V and G1 V, separated by two arc-seconds as of 2020. The outer pair take 542 years to complete a revolution while the inner pair complete their orbit within 32 years. 

HD 165259A has an iron abundance 82% above solar levels, making it metal enriched. HD 165259B has 85% the mass of the Sun and an effective temperature of 5,328 K, giving an orange glow. The faint star orbiting the primary has a mass 76% that of the Sun.

References

External links
 Image HD 165259

Apus (constellation)
165259
F-type main-sequence stars
6751
089234
CD-73 01348
Triple star systems
G-type main-sequence stars
Apodis, 67